Jaakko Tuominen (4 May 1944 – 27 October 2001) was a Finnish hurdler. He competed in the 400 metres hurdles at the 1964 Summer Olympics and the 1968 Summer Olympics, where he was the captain of the track team. Tuominen moved with his family to the United States in the early 1990s.

References

External links
 Jaakko speaking - see 20:43 - Jaakko Tuominen speaking in Tough of the Track: The Ian Stewart Story
 

1944 births
2001 deaths
Athletes (track and field) at the 1964 Summer Olympics
Athletes (track and field) at the 1968 Summer Olympics
Finnish male hurdlers
Olympic athletes of Finland
Finnish emigrants to the United States
People from Orimattila
Sportspeople from Päijät-Häme